Herty may refer to:

Charles Herty (1867–1938), American academic, scientist, and businessman
Herty Advanced Materials Development Center, a research facility in Savannah, Georgia
Herty Field, a sports facility at the University of Georgia
Herty Lewites (1939–2006), a Nicaraguan politician
Herty Medal, an award presented by the American Chemical Society
Herty, Texas, an unincorporated community in Angelina County, Texas
SS Charles H. Herty, a United States Marine Corps ship